Jeff Overbaugh (born November 24, 1993) is a former American football long snapper. He played college football at San Diego State.

Professional career

Los Angeles Rams
Overbaugh signed with the Los Angeles Rams as an undrafted free agent on June 10, 2016. He was waived by the Rams on August 30, 2016.

Denver Broncos
On January 2, 2017, Overbaugh signed a future contract with the Denver Broncos. He was waived by the Broncos on May 4, 2017.

Chicago Bears
On August 28, 2017, Overbaugh signed with the Chicago Bears following an injury to Patrick Scales. He was waived by the Bears on September 3, 2017 after the team claimed Andrew DePaola off waivers.

Minnesota Vikings
On December 26, 2017, Overbaugh signed with the Minnesota Vikings following an injury to Kevin McDermott.

Atlanta Falcons
On September 2, 2018, Overbaugh was signed to the Atlanta Falcons' practice squad. He was promoted to the active roster on September 6, 2018 due to an injury to Josh Harris. He was waived on September 10, 2018.

Atlanta Legends
On December 27, 2018, Overbaugh signed with the Atlanta Legends. The league ceased operations in April 2019.

In popular culture

The Conners
In the episode "Smoking Penguins and Santa on Santa Action", the kids buy Dan Conner a Chicago Bears game-worn jersey for his birthday. When Dan sees the name Overbaugh he asks who he is. Darlene explains that he was the long snapper that played for the Bears for a week in 2017 and that she thinks that Overbaugh was the only other bidder for the jersey. Dan is excited to have the jersey.

References

External links
San Diego State Aztecs bio
Minnesota Vikings bio 

1993 births
Living people
American football long snappers
Atlanta Falcons players
Atlanta Legends players
Chicago Bears players
Denver Broncos players
Los Angeles Rams players
Minnesota Vikings players
Players of American football from Anchorage, Alaska
Players of American football from New Mexico
San Diego State Aztecs football players
Sportspeople from Santa Fe, New Mexico